The Boston mayoral election of 1997 occurred on Tuesday, November 4, 1997. Incumbent Thomas Menino ran unopposed, and was re-elected to his second term; he received 71 percent of the vote. This was the first time an incumbent mayor of Boston faced no opposition on the ballot in a general election. Menino only faced write-in opposition.

Ahead of the election, four little-known individuals had declared their candidacy for mayor. None managed to collect the 3,000 valid signatures needed to qualify for the ballot, leaving Menino without an opponent on the ballot. Reasons dissuading more substantial opponents might have been the large campaign funding reserves Menino had and his great popularity, with a 1997 approval poll giving him a 74% approval rating.

Candidates
Thomas Menino, Mayor of Boston since July 12, 1993, Boston City Councilor from 1984 to 1993, and Council President in 1993.

See also
List of mayors of Boston, Massachusetts

References

Mayoral election
Boston mayoral
Boston
Mayoral elections in Boston
Non-partisan elections